SCR 1845−6357 is a binary system, about 13 light-years away in the constellation Pavo. The primary is a faint red dwarf. It has a brown dwarf companion. The primary red dwarf was discovered in 2004 by Hambly et al., while the secondary brown dwarf was later discovered in 2006.

System

The primary, SCR 1845−6357A, is a faint (apparent magnitude 17.4) ultra-cool red dwarf with a mass of about 7% of the Sun's. However, the measurements are still preliminary and are subject to change.

This star has been found to possess a brown dwarf companion, designated SCR 1845-6357B. The companion, classified as a T-dwarf, has an observed projected distance of 4.1 AU, an estimated mass between 40 and 50 times the mass of Jupiter, and an estimated effective temperature of 950 K. The brown dwarf has a near-IR J-band magnitude of 13.26.

See also
OTS 44
Cha 110913−773444
List of nearest stars and brown dwarfs

References

 B.A. Biller et al., 2006, "Discovery of a Brown Dwarf Very Close to the Sun: A Methane-rich Brown Dwarf Companion to the Low-Mass Star SCR 1845-6357", Astrophysical Journal Letters.

External links
New Objects within 20 light-years at SolStation.
SCR 1845−6357

Local Bubble
M-type main-sequence stars
Brown dwarfs
Pavo (constellation)
T-type stars